Clayton "Clay" Westervelt is a film director, producer, and cinematographer based in Los Angeles, California.  He is the founder of Martini Crew Booking and Imaginaut Entertainment.

Career
Westervelt attended graduate school at University of Southern California for film, where he received both the Bush and Kodak Awards for Excellence in Cinematography.  Subsequently, he filmed pilots for ABC, A&E, Animal Planet, and HGTV. He also produced and directed the award-winning series Storyline Online, featuring such talents as Elijah Wood, Betty White, James Earl Jones, and Al Gore.

In 2009, Westervelt was the Director of Photography for the documentary film The Legend of Pancho Barnes and the Happy Bottom Riding Club, which won an LA-area Emmy award in the Arts & Culture / History category.

He directed and produced the documentaries Popatopolis (2009) and Skum Rocks! (2013) and was cinematographer for Lucky Bastard in 2013.

Martini Crew Booking
Westervelt established Martini Crew Booking as a gear and service provider for television productions in 2000.

Imaginaut Entertainment, Inc.
In 2003, Westervelt founded Imaginaut Entertainment, Inc., through which he produced the SAG Foundation series, Storyline Online.

Filmography

Director

Awards

References

External links

Living people
Year of birth missing (living people)
Place of birth missing (living people)
American cinematographers
American film directors
American film producers
USC School of Cinematic Arts alumni